Jeevan Nedunchezhiyan and Christopher Rungkat were the defending champions but chose not to defend their title.

Marcos Giron and Dennis Novikov won the title after defeating Ante Pavić and Ruan Roelofse 6–4, 7–6(7–3) in the final.

Seeds

Draw

References
 Main draw

RBC Tennis Championships of Dallas - Doubles
2019 Doubles